Levocetirizine, sold under the brand name Xyzal among others, is a second-generation antihistamine used for the treatment of allergic rhinitis (hay fever) and long term hives of unclear cause. It is less sedating than older antihistamines. It is taken by mouth.

Common side effects include sleepiness, dry mouth, cough, vomiting, and diarrhea. Use in pregnancy appears safe but has not been well studied and use when breastfeeding is of unclear safety. It is classified as a second-generation antihistamine and works by blocking histamine H1-receptors.

Levocetirizine was approved for medical use in the United States in 2007. It is available as a generic medication. In 2020, it was the 179th most commonly prescribed medication in the United States, with more than 3million prescriptions.

Medical uses 
Levocetirizine is used for allergic rhinitis. This includes allergy symptoms such as watery eyes, runny nose, sneezing, hives, and itching.

Side effects 
Levocetirizine is referred to as a non-sedating antihistamine as it does not enter the brain in significant amounts and is therefore unlikely to cause drowsiness. Cardiac safety with repolarization may be better than some other antihistamines, as levocetirizine does not significantly prolong the QT interval in healthy individuals. However, some people may still experience some slight sleepiness, headache, mouth dryness, lightheadedness, vision problems (mainly blurred vision), palpitations and fatigue.

Pharmacology 
Levocetirizine is an antihistamine. It acts as an inverse agonist that decreases activity at histamine H1 receptors. This in turn prevents the release of other allergy chemicals and increases the blood supply to the area, providing relief from the typical symptoms of hay fever. Levocetirizine, (R)-(-)-cetirizine, is essentially a chiral switch of (±)-cetirizine. This enantiomer, the eutomer, is more selective and less sedative and the (S)-counterpart, the distomer, is inactive.

Chemistry 
Chemically, levocetirizine is the active levorotary enantiomer of cetirizine, also called the l-enantiomer of cetirizine. It is a member of the diphenylmethylpiperazine group of antihistamines.

History 
Levocetirizine was first launched in 2001 by the Belgian pharmaceutical company UCB (Union Chimique Belge).

Society and culture

Availability 
On 31 January 2017, the Food and Drug Administration approved an over-the-counter preparation. Levocetirizine had previously received authorization by the FDA as a prescription drug in 2007, having already been brought to market throughout much of Europe. In India, a prescription-only drug containing levocetirizine hydrochloride and montelukast is sold as Crohist MK.

Brand names 

Preparations of levocetirizine are sold under the following brand names:
 Xyzal  in Australia, Austria, Bulgaria, Croatia, Cyprus, Czech Republic, Finland, France, Hungary, India, Ireland (also Rinozal), Italy, Japan, Lithuania, Netherlands, Poland, Portugal, Romania, Taiwan, Thailand, Turkey, The Philippines, Serbia, Singapore, Slovakia, Slovenia, South Africa, Spain, Switzerland and UK. On May 25, 2007, the United States Food and Drug Administration approved Xyzal, where it is co-marketed by Sanofi-Aventis.
 Zobral in Cyprus
 Levobert in India
 Xusal in Germany and Mexico
 Xozal in Greece
 Degraler in Chile
 Allevo in Egypt
 Zilola, Histisynt, and Xyzal (UCB) in Hungary
 Alcet, Curin, and Seasonix in Bangladesh
 Vozet and Uvnil in India
 T-Day Syrup in Pakistan
 Curin in Nepal.
 Zenaro in the Czech Republic and Slovakia
 Xuzal and Zival in Chile
 Cezera, Levosetil, Robenan, and Xyzal in Serbia.
 Rinozal and Xyzal in Ireland

References

External links 
 
 

Acetic acids
Belgian inventions
Benzene derivatives
Chloroarenes
Enantiopure drugs
Ethers
H1 receptor antagonists
Peripherally selective drugs
Piperazines
Wikipedia medicine articles ready to translate